Leptobrachella is a genus of frogs in the family Megophryidae. Members of Leptobrachella are found throughout Asia including on Borneo and the Natuna Islands. They are sometimes referred to as Borneo frogs, slender-armed frogs, or dwarf litter frogs. The genus contains over 82 species with 25 found in China alone.

Description
Leptobrachella are small frogs that are not easily seen as they are well camouflaged on the ground. However, their advertisement call is loud, and they can be abundant along streams.

The tadpoles of Leptobrachella are unusual in their vermiform or eel-like appearance. The transition from the narrow, cylindrical trunk into the strong tail is nearly seamless, and the tail fin is very low. This body shape is interpreted as an adaptation to a fossorial life style: Leptobrachella tadpoles live in the gravel beds of small streams. In Leptobrachella mjobergi where more detailed observations have been made, tadpoles have unusually mobile head and trunk. While smaller tadpoles seem to use existing interstitial spaces, larger ones can actively push their way through gravel.

Consumption & Reproduction
Leptobrachella are commonly known as Leaf-Litter Frogs. They are carnivorous amphibians, consuming about any insect, such as mosquitoes, spiders, grasshoppers, & butterflies (Cheng, 2021). In terms of reproduction, they lay their eggs in the water, such as ponds. Eventually those eggs hatch into larvae called - tadpoles. These tadpoles have tails & internal gills (Cheng, 2021).

Location
Leptobrachella are usually found in the forests of Southeast Asia; however they can be found in southwestern Cambodia and adjacent to Thailand (Cheng, 2021). Morever, Leptobrachella is a brand new species, with 82 species in the world, currently. This number is expected to rise as scientists continue to search for more toads in Asia (Cheng, 2021).

Species
There are 45 species recognised in the genus Leptobrachella:

References
Cheng, Shi, S.-C., Li, J., Liu, J., Li, S.-Z., & Wang, B. (2021). A new species of the Asian leaf litter toad genus Leptobrachella Smith, 1925 (Anura, Megophryidae) from northwest Guizhou Province, China. ZooKeys, 1021(8), 81–107. https://doi.org/10.3897/zookeys.1021.60729

 
Megophryidae
Amphibian genera
Frogs of Asia
Taxa named by Hobart Muir Smith